The 2015–16 Turkish Women's Volleyball League is the 33rd edition of the top-flight professional women's volleyball league in Turkey.

Regular season

League table

Results

Play-out

Classification group

Final group

Awards

Most Valuable Player
  Kimberly Hill (VakıfBank)
Best Setter
  Naz Aydemir (VakıfBank)
Best Outside Spikers
  Kim Yeon-Koung (Fenerbahçe Grundig)
  Jordan Larson (Eczacıbaşı VitrA)

Best Middle Blockers
  Eda Erdem Dündar (Fenerbahçe Grundig)
  Milena Rašić (VakıfBank)
Best Opposite Spiker
  Lonneke Sloetjes(VakıfBank)
Best Libero
  Gizem Örge (VakıfBank)
Fair Play Award
  Nihan Güneyliğil (Galatasaray Daikin)

References

External links 
Turkish Volleyball Federation official web page

2015 in Turkish women's sport
2016 in Turkish women's sport
Turkey
Turkish Women's Volleyball League seasons